John Henry Kyl (May 9, 1919 – December 23, 2002) was an American politician who served as a member of the United States House of Representatives, representing Iowa's 4th congressional district from 1959 to 1965 and again from 1967 to 1973. He was a member of the Republican Party.

Early life and education 
Kyl was born in Wisner, Nebraska, the son of Johanna (née Boonstra) and Jon George Kyl, both Dutch immigrants. He graduated from Nebraska State Teachers College (Wayne, Nebraska) and the University of Nebraska.

Career 
Kyl was a teacher at Nebraska State Teachers College from 1940 to 1950. In the 1950s, he moved to Bloomfield, Iowa where he joined his brother George in the clothing business. He also worked as a television journalist for KTVO in Ottumwa, Iowa.

Kyl ran for the U.S. House of Representatives in 1958, losing to Steven V. Carter. However, Carter died on November 4, 1959 after less than one year in office. Kyl then won a special election to fill the vacancy. He continued to serve as the representative from Iowa's 4th congressional district for two additional terms, but was defeated in the 1964 United States House of Representatives elections, in which Democrats gained 36 seats in the House. He recaptured his former seat in 1966, and then won re-election in 1968 and 1970. Reapportionment after the 1970 census put him into the same district as incumbent Democrat Neal Edward Smith, who defeated him in the 1972 election.

From 1973 to 1977, he served as Assistant Secretary for Congressional and Legislative Affairs in the United States Department of the Interior.

Personal life 
Kyl was married to Arlene (née Griffith), with whom he had three children, including Jon Kyl. Jon went on to serve as a three-term U.S. Senator from Arizona, from 1995 to 2013 and briefly in 2018. He also served as Senate Minority Whip.

References

External links
 
 

1919 births
2002 deaths
20th-century American politicians
American male journalists
American people of Dutch descent
Wayne State College faculty
American television journalists
Ford administration personnel
Nixon administration personnel
People from Bloomfield, Iowa
People from Wisner, Nebraska
United States Assistant Secretaries of the Interior
University of Nebraska–Lincoln alumni
Wayne State College alumni
Republican Party members of the United States House of Representatives from Iowa
20th-century American journalists
20th-century American educators